Attock is a city in Punjab, Pakistan.

Attock may also refer to:

Places 
Attock District, a district of Pakistan.
Attock Tehsil, a tehsil of Attock district.
Attock Khurd, an ancient town in Punjab, Pakistan

Companies
Attock Refinery Limited, crude oil refinery company in Pakistan.
Attock Petroleum Limited, oil marketing company in Pakistan.
Attock Group, group of companies in Pakistan.

Transport
Attock Passenger, a name of train.
Attock City Junction railway station, a name of railway station in Pakistan.
Attock Khurd railway station, a name of railway station in Attock Khurd.

Sports
Attock Group cricket team, a local cricket team.

See also